Lewis Kevin Lloyd (February 22, 1959 – July 5, 2019) was an American basketball player. A 6'6" swingman from Drake University, he played most of his professional career for the National Basketball Association's Houston Rockets.

Early life
Nicknamed "Black Magic," Lloyd played his high school basketball at Overbrook High School in Philadelphia, the same as Wilt Chamberlain.

College career 
He graduated from Drake University in Des Moines, Iowa after starting his college career at the junior college, New Mexico Military Institute in Roswell. Lloyd averaged 30.2 points and 15 rebounds per game in his junior year and 26.3 per game as a Senior. He was a two-time winner of the Missouri Valley Conference Player of the Year while at Drake. Lloyd's #30 jersey is retired at Drake.

Professional career

Golden State Warriors (1981-1983) 
Lloyd played seven seasons in the NBA, after being selected in the fourth round of the 1981 NBA Draft by the Golden State Warriors.

Houston Rockets (1983-1987) 
After two seasons in Oakland, he moved to the Houston Rockets, where he would play three full seasons, appearing in 246 out of 246 possible regular season contests while always scoring in double digits. In late 1986, however, he tested positive for cocaine alongside teammate Mitchell Wiggins, incurring a -year suspension from the league.

Cedar Rapids Silver Bullets (1988-1989) 
While suspended from the NBA, Lloyd played for the Cedar Rapids Silver Bullets in the Continental Basketball Association during the 1988–89 season. He averaged 18.8 points and 6.6 rebounds over 18 games.

Return to Houston and Philadelphia 76ers (1989-1990) 
Soon after his reinstatement in September 1989, Lloyd was released by Houston, retiring at the end of the season after two games with the Philadelphia 76ers, holding averages of 13 points, three rebounds and three assists, in 388 games. He also appeared in 20 post-season contests in 1986 as the Rockets reached the NBA Finals, losing 4-2 to the Boston Celtics.

Personal life
After retiring from basketball in the 2000s, Lloyd conducted youth basketball clinics along with coaching at basketball camps in Philadelphia, Des Moines, and Wichita.

Lloyd died on July 5, 2019.

References

External links

1959 births
2019 deaths
20th-century African-American sportspeople
21st-century African-American people
African-American basketball players
All-American college men's basketball players
American expatriate basketball people in the Philippines
American men's basketball players
Basketball players from Philadelphia
Cedar Rapids Silver Bullets players
Doping cases in basketball
Drake Bulldogs men's basketball players
Golden State Warriors draft picks
Golden State Warriors players
Houston Rockets players
Junior college men's basketball players in the United States
National Basketball Association players banned for drug offenses
New Mexico Military Institute alumni
Philadelphia 76ers players
Philippine Basketball Association imports
Pop Cola Panthers players
Shooting guards
Small forwards
United States Basketball League players